Henry de Bada (or Henry de Bathonia) (died November 1260) was an English judge and administrator.

Life 
He began his career under his relative Hugh of Bath, who died in 1236, leaving his chattels to Henry. Henry started his administrative career as a bailiff for the Honour of Berkhamsted in 1221, succeeding Hugh as Under-Sheriff of Berkshire from 1228 to 1229. This is the last record of his career under Hugh; from then on he was entirely independent. From 1229 to 1232 he served as Under-Sheriff for Hampshire and as High Sheriff of Gloucestershire from 1232 to 1234, a time when the county was the main base for the Marcher Wars of 1233-1234. He served as High Sheriff as an agent of Peter de Rivaux, and as such required a pardon after Peters fall from grace in 1234, Peter and his close associates having been declared traitors.

Career 
Immediately after the pardon, however, he became High Sheriff of Northamptonshire, and remained in that position until 1240 other than a two-month period as both High Sheriff of Surrey and of Sussex in 1236. In 1238 he became a junior justice of the bench in Westminster, continuing to administrate Northamptonshire through deputies. Between 1240 and 1241 he worked on the Eyre Circuit for William of York as the second-most senior justice, holding an Eyre in Hampshire in 1241 in which he was the senior judge.

In 1241 he went on a mission to Ireland, and on his return served for two terms as a justice Coram Rege (in the presence of the King) until 1242. After Henry III left for his trip to Gascony in 1242 he was made High Sheriff of Yorkshire, a position he held until 1248 (although it was administrated by his deputies from 1245 onwards). In 1245 he became Chief Justice of the Court of Common Pleas. From 1247 to 1249 he acted as the senior justice for an Eyre circuit, during which period the Court of Common Pleas did not sit. In 1249 he was again promoted, leaving his position of Chief Justice, and received a salary of over £100 a year.  Between 1250 and 1251 he was senior justice for another Eyre circuit, at which point he was accused of deliberately perverting the course of justice, for which his judicial position was taken, he was stripped of his position as Keeper of Gloucester Castle and he was fined 2000 marks, part of which was still unpaid when he died.

Henry came back into royal favour in 1253, shortly before another of Henry's trips to Gascony, and was made Chief Justice of the Common Pleas yet again in 1256, serving until 1258 and dying in November 1260.

References 

1260 deaths
Chief Justices of the Common Pleas
High Sheriffs of Gloucestershire
High Sheriffs of Northamptonshire
High Sheriffs of Yorkshire
High Sheriffs of Surrey
High Sheriffs of Sussex
Justices of the Common Pleas
Year of birth unknown